Colaxes nitidiventris is a jumping spider species that lives in India.  It was discovered by Eugène Simon in 1900 and is the type species for the genus Colaxes.

References

Salticidae
Spiders of the Indian subcontinent
Taxa named by Eugène Simon
Spiders described in 1900